Satyrium nepalense is a species of orchid occurring from the Indian subcontinent to south-central China.

References 

nepalense
Orchids of China
Orchids of India
Plants described in 1825